The Swampy Cree people, also known by their autonyms Néhinaw, Maskiki Wi Iniwak, Mushkekowuk, Maškékowak or Maskekon (and therefore also Muskegon and Muskegoes) or by exonyms including West Main Cree, Lowland Cree, and Homeguard Cree, are a division of the Cree Nation occupying lands located in northern Manitoba, along the Saskatchewan River in northeastern Saskatchewan, along the shores of Hudson Bay and adjoining interior lands south and west as well 
as territories along the shores of Hudson and James Bay in Ontario. They are geographically and to some extent culturally split into two main groupings, and therefore speak two dialects of the Swampy Cree language, which is an "n-dialect":
 Western Swampy Cree called themselves: Mushkego, Mushkegowuk (or Maškēkowak), also called Lowland (Half-Homeguard) Cree, speak the western dialect of the Swampy Cree language, while the s/š distinction is kept in the eastern dialect, the western dialect have merged both into s
 Eastern Swampy Cree / Western James Bay Cree called themselves: Omaškêkowak, Omushkego, Omushkegowak, together with the Moose Cree also called Lowland Cree, Lowland (Homeguard) Cree, West Main Cree, James Bay Mushkego, because they were living along the western shores of the Hudson and James Bay they were oft also known as Western James Bay Cree, reflecting their position in contrast to the (Eastern) James Bay Cree, speak the eastern dialect of the Swampy Cree language, which kept the s/š distinction

European contact 

First Nations
Historically, the Cree nations in the central part of the Cree continuum were classified by their relationship to Hudson Bay and James Bay: Lowland (Homeguard) Cree who were found along the coast, Lowland (Half-Homeguard) Cree who seasonally transitioned between the coast and the interior, and the Upland Cree in the deep interior who often were intermixed with the Ojibwe. West of these Lowland and Upland Cree were the Woodland and Plains Cree. Linguistically, the Cree are divided by their general language features, where the Cree nations in the central part of the Cree continuum are classified as "th-Cree", "n-Cree" and "l-Cree", from west to east; Cree traditionally associated with the Woodland Cree make no distinction between "s" and "š", while the Lowland and Upland Cree do. Today, together with the "n-Cree" dialect-speaking Woodland Cree, those who live in the Lowlands and Uplands who speak the "n-Cree" dialect are called "Swampy Cree", but culturally Moose Cree (the Cree speaking the "l-dialect") and other peoples of the Upland including the Oji-Cree occasionally self-identify as being "Swampy Cree".

West Swampy Cree
 Winnipeg Cree (historical)
Chemawawin Cree Nation (also Rocky Cree)
Cumberland House Cree Nation
Fisher River Cree Nation
Fort Severn First Nation
Fox Lake Cree Nation
Marcel Colomb First Nation (also Rocky Cree)
Mathias Colomb First Nation (also Rocky Cree)
Misipawistik Cree Nation
Mosakahiken Cree Nation
Opaskwayak Cree Nation
Red Earth First Nation
Sapotaweyak Cree Nation (also Plains Cree and Saulteaux)
Shamattawa Cree Nation
Shoal Lake Cree Nation
Tataskweyak Cree Nation
War Lake First Nation
Wuskwi Sipihk First Nation
York Factory First Nation
East Swampy Cree
Albany River Cree (historical)
Fort Albany First Nation (also Ojibwe)
Kashechewan First Nation (also Moose Cree)
Attawapiskat River Cree (historical)
Attawapiskat First Nation
 Mattagami River Cree (historical)
Flying Post First Nation (also Ojibwe)
 Nipigon Cree (historical)
 Severn River Cree (historical)
(see also Oji-Cree)
 Winisk River Cree (historical)
Weenusk First Nation
(see also Oji-Cree)
Moose Cree
 Abitibi River Cree (historical)
 Abitibiwinni First Nation (also Algonquin and Ojibwe)
 Wahgoshig First Nation (also Algonquin and Ojibwe)
 Moose River Cree (historical)
Brunswick House First Nation (also Ojibwe)
Chapleau Cree First Nation
Constance Lake First Nation (also Oji-Cree and Ojibwe)
Kashechewan First Nation (also Swampy Cree)
Matachewan First Nation (also Ojibwe)
Missanabie Cree First Nation (also Ojibwe)
Moose Cree First Nation
Taykwa Tagamou Nation
 Lake Nipigon Cree (historical)
 Piscotagami River Cree (historical)
 Rainy Lake Cree (historical)
 Mishkeegogamang First Nation (also Cree, Ojibwe)

Ethnonyms
Reflecting either Swampy Cree (O)maškêko(wak) "Swampy(-ies)", or Odawa (O)mashkiigo(wag) "Swampy(-ies)"
Mashkégous.—Petitot in Can. Rec. Sci., I, 48, 1884.
Maskègowuk.—Hutchins (1770) quoted by Richardson, Arct. Exped. II, 37, 1851.
Masquikoukiaks.—Prise de Possession (1671) in Perrot, Mémoire, 293, 1864.
Masquikoukioeks.—Prise de Possession (1671) in Margry, Déc., I, 97, 1875.
Meskigouk.—Long, Exped. St Peter's R., II, 151, 1824.
Mis-Keegoes.—Ross, Fur Hunters, II, 220, 1855.
Muskeg.--Hind. Red R. Exped., I, 112, 1860.
Muskeggouck.—West, Jour., 19, 1824.
Muskegoe.—Tanner, Narr., 45 1830.
Muskegoag.—Tanner, Narr., 315 1830.
Muskegons.—Galatin "A Synopsis of the Indian Tribes in North America", in Archæologia Americana : Transactions and Collections of the American Antiquarian Society, II, 24, 1836.
Muskigos.—Maximillian, Trav., II, 28, 1841.
Musk-keeg-oes.—Warren (1852) in Minnesota Historical Society Collections, V, 45, 1885.
Mustegans.—Hind, Labrador Penin., II, 16, 1863.
Mashkegons.—Belcourt (ca. 1850) in Minnesota Historical Society Collections, I, 227, 1872.
Maskigoes.—Schoolcraft, Indian Tribes, II, 36, 1852.
Muscagoes.—Harmon, Jour., 84, 1820.
Mus-conogee.—Schermerhorn (1812) in Massachusetts Historical Society Collections, 2d s., II, 11, 1814.
Muscononges.—Pike, Exped., app. to pt. 1, 64, 1810.
Muskeags.—Schoolcraft. Indian Tribes, VI, 33, 1857.
Muskagoes.—Harmon (1801) quoted by Jones, Ojebway Inds., 166, 1861.
Mus-ka-go-wuk.—Morgan. Systems of Consanguinity and Affinity of the Human Family, 287, 1871.
Reflecting Swampy Cree (O)maškêko-ininiw(ak) "Swamp People"
Mashkegonhyrinis.—Bacquerville de la Potherie, Hist. Am, I, 168, 1783.
Maskigonehirinis.—Dobbs, Hudson Bay, 25, 1744.
Miskogonhirinis.—Dobbs, Hudson Bay, 23, 1744.
Reflecting Ojibwe (O)mashkiigoo(g) "Swampy(-ies)"
Muskeegoo.—Jones, Ojebway Inds., 178, 1861.
Muskego Ojibways.—Warren (1852) in Minnesota Historical Society Collections, V, 378, 1885.
Muskegoo.—Canada. Department of Indian Affairs (common form).
Omaskekok.—Belcourt (ca. 1850) in Minnesota Historical Society Collections, I, 227-8, 1885.
Omush-ke-goag.—Warren (1852) in Minnesota Historical Society Collections, V, 33, 1885.
Omushke-goes.—Warren (1852) in Minnesota Historical Society Collections, V, 85, 1885.

Reflecting a translation
Cree of the lowlands.—Morgan, Systems of Consanguinity and Affinity of the Human Family, 287, 1871.
People of the Lowlands.—Morgan, Systems of Consanguinity and Affinity of the Human Family, 287, 1871.
Savannas.—Chauvignerie (1836) in New York Documents of Colonial History, IX, 1054, 1855.
Savanois.—Charlevoix, Nouv.Fr., 277, 1744.
Swampee.—Reid in Jour. Anthrop. Inst of G. Br., VII, 107, 1874.
Swampies.—M'Lean, Hudson Bay, II, 19, 1824.
Swampy Crees.—Franklin, Journ. to Polar Sea, 38, 1824.
Swampy Creek Indians.—Hind, Labrador Penin., I, 8, 1863 (for 'Swampy Cree Indians').
Swampy Krees.—Keane in Stanford, Compend., 536, 1878.
Swampys.—Hind, Labrador Penin., I, 323, 1863.

Other
Big-Heads.—Donnelly in Canada. Department of Indian Affairs, Annual Report for 1883, pt. 1, 10, 1884.
Coast Crees.—Back, Arct. Land Exped., app., 194, 1836.
Waub-ose.—Warren (1852) in Minnesota Historical Society Collections, V, 86, 1885 (Waabooz ('rabbit'): Ojibwe name, referring to their peaceful character; applied also to the Bois Forte Band).

Notes

References

Ellis, Clarence Douglas. 1995. âtalôhkâna nêsta tipâcimôwina: Cree legends and narratives from the West Coast of James Bay. Text and translation. Edited and with a glossary by C. Douglas Ellis. Winnipeg: University of Manitoba Press. 
Honigmann, John J. 1981. “West Main Cree.” in June Helm, ed., The Handbook of North American Indians, Volume 6. Subarctic, pp. 217–230. Washington, D.C.: The Smithsonian Institution. 
Lovisek, Joan A. 1999. "Aboriginals: Algonquians/Subarctic." Paul R. Magocsi, ed., Encyclopedia of Canada's Peoples; 36–47. Toronto: Multicultural History Society of Ontario. 
Lytwyn, Victor P. 2002. Muskekowuck Athinuwick: Original People of the Great Swampy Land. 
Pritzker, Barry. 1998. "Cree" in Native Americans: An Encyclopedia of History, Culture, and Peoples, Volume 1 pp. 709–715 
Rhodes, Richard and Evelyn Todd. 1981. “Subarctic Algonquian languages.” in June Helm, ed., The Handbook of North American Indians, Volume 6. Subarctic, pp. 52–66. Washington, D.C.: The Smithsonian Institution.

External links
Mushkegowuk Council
Swampy Cree Tribal Council

 
First Nations in Manitoba
Cree
First Nations in Ontario